Forgotten Fire (2002) is a young adult novel by Adam Bagdasarian. The book is based on a true story and follows the young boy Vahan Kenderian through the Armenian genocide of 1915 to 1923. It became a National Book Award finalist, National Book Award for Young People's Literature honor, and the IRA Children's Literature and Reading Notable Book for a Global Society.

Plot summary
In 1915 Vahan Kenderian is living a life of privilege as the youngest son of a wealthy Armenian family in Turkey. This secure world is shattered when some family members are whisked away while others are murdered before his eyes.

Vahan loses his home and family, and is forced to live a life he would never have dreamed of in order to survive. Somehow Vahan’s incredible strength and spirit help him endure, even knowing that each day could be his last.

Characters
Vahan Kenderian- the protagonist of the story. Throughout the novel, Vahan goes through many difficult experiences before reaching the final destination Constantinople and safety. He runs away from Turkish soldiers, fakes deafness, experiences family deaths, Vahan isn't the most brilliant or brave of the Armenians, but he is fortunately helped by many people along the way.

Sisak Kenderian - Vahan's brother who he found nearly dead in the street.
Armenouhi Kenderian - Vahan's sister who eats poison to avoid the possibility of being killed through being captured and held prisoner at the Goryan's Inn. 
Oskina Kenderian - Vahan's sister who he becomes separated from but eventually reunites with.
Mumpreh Kenderian - Vahan's uncle who was accused of being a revolutionary and disappeared from the household soon after being returned.
Selim Bey - The "Butcher of Armenians." Governor of Van and responsible for the deaths of the thousands of Armenians.  
Diran Kenderian - Vahan's older brother who is killed by Turkish soldiers very early in the book.
Sarkis Kendrian - Vahan's father who is taken before the rest of the family and perishes in an unknown way.
Toumia Kendrian - Vahan's grandmother who is killed beside the Tigriwith. 
Tavel Kenderian- Vahan's other older brother who is killed by Turkish soldiers before they are taken to the Inn.
Pattoo - Vahan′s friend.

Reception
Forgotten Fire received favorable reviews from Kirkus Reviews, Publishers Weekly, and Booklist. The book received the following accolades:

 National Book Awards for Young People's Literature Finalist (2000)
 American Library Association Top Ten Best Books for Young Adults (2001)
 Popular Paperbacks for Young Adults (2003)
 Outstanding Books for the College Bound and Lifelong Learners (2009)
 IRA Children's Literature and Reading Notable Book for a Global Society

References

2002 American novels
American young adult novels
Novels set in the 1910s
Novels set in the 1920s
Novels set in Armenia
Novels set in the Ottoman Empire
Fiction books about the Armenian genocide